Mohsen Sarhan (6 January 1914 in Port Said – 7 February 1993 in Cairo) was an Egyptian actor in multiple films and as part of the National Troupe.

Biography
One of his performances as part of the National Troupe received praise from The Scribe Arab Review. He was once married to Samiha Ayoub, who has been referred to as "Arab theatre's leading lady".

Selected filmography
Ibn El-balad (1942)
Lak Yawm Ya Zalem (1951)
Deprived Lover (1954)Kuwait Connection (1973)Traveller Without A Road (1978)Howa wa heya'' (1985)

References

1914 births
1993 deaths
Egyptian male actors
Actors from Port Said